Flip the Frog is an animated cartoon character created by American animator Ub Iwerks. He starred in a series of cartoons produced by Celebrity Pictures and distributed by Metro-Goldwyn-Mayer from 1930 to 1933. The series had many recurring characters besides Flip; including Flip's dog, the mule Orace, and a dizzy neighborhood spinster.

History of Flip
Ub Iwerks was an animator for the Walt Disney Studios and a personal friend of Walt Disney in 1930. After a series of disputes between the two, Iwerks left Disney and went on to accept an offer from Pat Powers to open a cartoon studio of his own, Iwerks Studios, and receive a salary of $300 a week, an offer that Disney was unable to match at the time.

Iwerks was to produce new cartoons under Powers' Celebrity Pictures auspices and distributed by Metro-Goldwyn-Mayer. The first series he was to produce was to feature a character called Tony the Frog, but Iwerks disliked the name and it was subsequently changed to Flip.

Ub Iwerks planned to release the series in both color and black and white versions through Celebrity Productions, Inc. The series attracted public attention in England by being the first color sound cartoon series, in the two-color British Multicolor System. These shorts were exhibited in England in color, but not in the United States where they were made. After four shorts had been produced (Fiddlesticks, Flying Fists, Little Orphan Willie and Puddle Pranks) MGM picked up the series. They agreed to exhibit Fiddlesticks and Flying Fists. Little Orphan Willie and Puddle Pranks were never copyrighted and remain in the public domain. MGM decided to produce the series entirely in black and white, releasing the ones produced in color in black and white versions only. Some have speculated that Techno-Cracked (1933) may have been photographed in Cinecolor. The Cinecolor process was a new two-color process that came out in 1932, the year that Technicolor began phasing out its two-color system in favor of their new three-strip process. Iwerks would go on to make extensive use of Cinecolor with his ComiColor Cartoon series.

Iwerks' studio quickly began accumulating new talent, such as animators Fred Kopietz, Irv Spence, Grim Natwick, and Chuck Jones (who worked at the Iwerks studio as a cel-washer before going on to inbetweening and then animating at the Leon Schlesinger studio). After the first two cartoons, the appearance of Flip the Frog gradually became less froglike. This was done under the encouragement of MGM, who thought that the series would sell better if the character were more humanized. Flip's major redesign is attributed to Grim Natwick, who made a name for himself at the Fleischer Studios with the creation of Betty Boop. Natwick also had a hand in changing Flip's girlfriend. In earlier films, she was consistently a cat, but Natwick made Flip's new girlfriend, Fifi, a human who shared distinct similarities with Betty (even down to her spit curls).

The frog's personality also began to develop. As the series progressed, Flip became more of a down-and-out, Chaplin-esque character who always found himself in everyday conflicts surrounding the poverty-stricken atmosphere of the Great Depression. Owing to the influx of New York City animators to Iwerks's studio, such as Natwick, the shorts became increasingly risqué. In Room Runners (1932), Flip, out of cash and luck, attempts to sneak out of his hotel in order to avoid paying his past-due rent. Another gag has Flip watch a girl taking a shower through a keyhole. In The Office Boy, released the same year, Flip tries to secure a low-level office job and meets a shapely secretary. At one point in the short, a mischievous mouse that Flip tries to apprehend scoots up the secretary's skirt. In A Chinaman's Chance (1933), Flip and his dog track down the notorious Chinese criminal Chow Mein. While investigating in a Chinese laundry, Flip stumbles into an opium den, inhales the stuff via opium pipe, and begins hallucinating.

The character eventually wore out his welcome at MGM. His final short was Soda Squirt, released in August 1933. Subsequently, Iwerks replaced the series with a new one starring an imaginative liar named Willie Whopper. Flip became largely forgotten by the public in the ensuing years. However, the character would make a small comeback when animation enthusiasts and historians began digging up the old Iwerks shorts. All of the Flip cartoons are now available in the 2004 Region 2 Flip the Frog DVD set released by Mk2/Lobster in France. Most are available in Region 1, in particular on the Cartoons That Time Forgot series.

Flip the Frog Annual
In 1932, a Flip the Frog Annual was issued in England by Dean & Son Ltd. Published "by exclusive arrangement with Ub Iwerks, The Originator of The Film Character, Flip The Frog", it was drawn by Wilfred Haughton, who also drew the early Mickey Mouse Annuals for Deans. The Annual only ran for one edition, based on Flip's ending in 1933 and the lack of success with it. The earlier, more froglike character was used rather than the later version. The book contains 11 full cartoon strip stories, 4 colour plates and other one-page items that are not derived from any of his cartoons. All the adventures take place outside, unlike the cartoons, and feature additional characters, including a fox, a policeman, a girlfriend (Flap), an Uncle Flop (mentioned only), and others not shown in the cartoon films.

Flip the Frog filmography

1930

1 Released in both color and black and white versions. Little Orphan Willie and Puddle Pranks were both rejected by MGM and never copyrighted. They were released by Celebrity Productions, Inc. who
also released Fiddlesticks and Flying Fists before the series was picked up by MGM.
2 First cartoon produced under contract to MGM.
3 This is the re-release date by MGM.

1931

1932

1 Retitled as 'Phoney Express' when the cartoon was reissued by Pat Powers.

1933

1 Possibly filmed in color.

Home media
All of Flip's cartoons were compiled on the French Mk2/Lobster Films 2004 2 disc DVD set "Flip the Frog".  Twenty-seven of Flip's cartoons are included in the two DVD collections "Cartoons That Time Forgot: The Ub Iwerks Collection Vol. 1 and 2."

Another early Flip short, Little Orphan Willie, while not included on either of those DVDs, is included on the DVD collection "Return of the 30s Characters" from Thunderbean Animation.

A complete Blu-ray set of restored Flip the Frog cartoons is in production from Thunderbean Animation; the set itself was planned to be released in mid-September, 2022 but is currently delayed as of October 17, 2022.

In popular culture
A clip of the character dancing from Fiddlesticks is featured on a television set in the music video for Eminem's song "The Real Slim Shady", which the viewer laughs at.

See also
Golden Age of American animation

References

Further reading
Iwerks, Leslie and Kenworthy, John. (2001): The Hand Behind the Mouse. Disney Editions.
Maltin, Leonard (1987): Of Mice and Magic: A History of American Animated Cartoons. Penguin Books.
Lenburg, Jeff (1993): The Great Cartoon Directors. Da Capo Press.
Flip The Frog Annual (1932). Dean & Son, London.
Flip The Frog Monthly (1935). Nat & Co., London.

External links
Flip the Frog at Don Markstein's Toonopedia. Archived from the original on July 30, 2016.
Fiddlesticks (1930) public domain theatrical cartoon short

Ub Iwerks Studio series and characters
MGM cartoon characters
Fictional frogs
Male characters in animation
Film characters introduced in 1930
Film series introduced in 1930
Metro-Goldwyn-Mayer animated short films